Rhaphium consobrinum is a species of fly in the family Dolichopodidae. It is found in the  Palearctic .

References

External links
Images representing Rhaphium consobrinum at BOLD

Rhaphiinae
Insects described in 1843
Asilomorph flies of Europe
Taxa named by Johan Wilhelm Zetterstedt